The Mexican Cycling Federation (in Spanish: Federación Mexicana de Ciclismo, FMC) is the national governing body of cycle racing in Mexico.

It covers the disciplines of road racing, track cycling, cyclo-cross, BMX, mountain biking and cycle speedway.

It is a Member of the UCI, Confederacion Panamericana de Ciclismo, Confederación Deportiva Mexicana (CODEME) and The Mexican Olympic Committee (COM).

In 2021, the UCI suspended the FMC for infringements regarding governance and electoral processes. This suspension was confirmed at the 2022 UCI Congress.

See also
Vuelta Mexico Telmex
Orven (Cycling Team)

External links
 Federación Mexicana de Ciclismo official website

References 

Mexico
Cycle racing in Mexico
Sports governing bodies in Mexico